Popponesset Creek is a small waterway in Mashpee, Massachusetts on Cape Cod.  On both ends, it connects with Popponesset Bay.

Popponesset Creek runs from Holly Marsh down to Popponesset Peninsula and serves to separate Popponesset Island from the bay.  An automobile bridge crosses Popponesset Creek from Holly Marsh to Popponesset Island.

Both sides of the creek are lined with saltwater marshland.

Rivers of Barnstable County, Massachusetts
Mashpee, Massachusetts
Rivers of Massachusetts